Formula One (more commonly known as Formula 1 or F1) is the highest class of international racing for open-wheel single-seater formula racing cars sanctioned by the Fédération Internationale de l'Automobile (FIA). The FIA Formula One World Championship has been one of the premier forms of racing around the world since its inaugural season in 1950. The word formula in the name refers to the set of rules to which all participants' cars must conform. A Formula One season consists of a series of races, known as Grands Prix. Grands Prix take place in multiple countries and continents around the world on either purpose-built circuits or closed public roads.

A points system is used at Grands Prix to determine two annual World Championships: one for the drivers, and one for the constructors (the teams). Each driver must hold a valid Super Licence, the highest class of racing licence issued by the FIA, and the races must be held on tracks graded "1", the highest grade-rating issued by the FIA for tracks.

Formula One cars are the fastest regulated road-course racing cars in the world, owing to very high cornering speeds achieved through the generation of large amounts of aerodynamic downforce. Much of this downforce is generated by front and rear wings, which have the side effect of causing severe turbulence behind each car. The turbulence reduces the downforce generated by the cars following directly behind, making it hard to overtake. Major changes made to the cars for the 2022 season has seen greater use of ground effect aerodynamics and modified wings to reduce the turbulence behind the cars, with the goal of making overtaking easier. The cars are dependent on electronics, aerodynamics, suspension and tyres.

With the average annual cost of running a team – designing, building, and maintaining cars, pay, transport – being approximately £220,000,000 (or $265,000,000), its financial and political battles are widely reported. On 23 January 2017, Liberty Media completed its acquisition of the Formula One Group, from private-equity firm CVC Capital Partners for £6,600,000,000 (or $8,000,000,000).

History

Formula One originated from the European Motor Racing Championships of the 1920s and 1930s. The formula consists of a set of rules that all participants' cars must follow. Formula One was a new formula agreed upon during 1946 with the first non-championship races taking place during that year. The first Formula One Grand Prix was the 1946 Turin Grand Prix. A number of Grand Prix racing organisations had laid out rules for a motor racing world championship before World War II, but due to the suspension of racing during the conflict, the World Drivers' Championship did not become formalised until 1947. The first world championship race took place at the Silverstone Circuit in the United Kingdom on 13 May 1950. Giuseppe Farina, competing for Alfa Romeo, won the first Drivers' World Championship, narrowly defeating his teammate Juan Manuel Fangio. This set the record for the most World Championships won by a single driver; a record that stood for 46 years until Michael Schumacher won his sixth championship in 2003.

A Constructors' Championship was added in the 1958 season. Stirling Moss, despite being regarded as one of the greatest Formula One drivers in the 1950s and 1960s, never won the Formula One championship. Between 1955 and 1961, Moss finished second place in the championship four times and in third place the other three times. Fangio, however, achieved the record of winning 24 of the 52 races he entered – a record for the highest percentage of Formula One races won by a single driver. This is a record he holds to this day. National championships existed in South Africa and the UK in the 1960s and 1970s. Non-championship Formula One events were held by promoters for many years. However, due to the increasing cost of competition, the last of these was held in 1983.

This time period featured teams managed by road-car manufacturers; such as: Alfa Romeo, Ferrari, Mercedes-Benz and Maserati. The first seasons featured pre-war cars like Alfa's 158. They were front-engined, with narrow tyres and 1.5-litre supercharged or 4.5-litre naturally aspirated engines. The  and  seasons were run to Formula Two regulations, for smaller, less powerful cars, due to concerns over the lack of Formula One cars available. When a new Formula One formula for engines limited to 2.5 litres was reinstated to the world championship for 1954, Mercedes-Benz introduced their W196. The W196 featured things never seen on Formula One cars before, such as: desmodromic valves, fuel injection and enclosed streamlined bodywork. Mercedes drivers won the championship for the next two years, before the team withdrew from all motorsport competitions due to the 1955 Le Mans disaster.

Technological developments 

The first major technological development in the sport was Bugatti's introduction of mid-engined cars. The Ferguson P99, a four-wheel drive design, was the last front-engined Formula One car to enter a world championship race. It was entered in the 1961 British Grand Prix, the only front-engined car to compete that year.

During , Lotus introduced a car with an aluminium-sheet monocoque chassis instead of the traditional space-frame design. This proved to be the greatest technological breakthrough since the introduction of mid-engined cars. During , Brabham became the first team to show advertisements on their cars. This introduced sponsorship to the sport. Five months later, Lotus followed Brabham's example when they painted an Imperial Tobacco livery on their cars at the 1968 Spanish Grand Prix.

Aerodynamic downforce slowly gained importance in car design with the appearance of aerofoils during the late 1960s. During the late 1970s, Lotus introduced ground-effect aerodynamics (previously used on Jim Hall's Chaparral 2J during 1970) that provided enormous downforce and greatly increased cornering speeds. The aerodynamic forces pressing the cars to the track were up to five times the car's weight. As a result, extremely stiff springs were needed to maintain a constant ride height, leaving the suspension virtually solid. This meant that the drivers were depending entirely on the tyres for any small amount of cushioning of the car and driver from irregularities of the road surface.

Big business
Beginning in the 1970s, Bernie Ecclestone rearranged the management of Formula One's commercial rights; he is widely credited with transforming the sport into the multibillion-dollar business it now is. When Ecclestone bought the Brabham team during 1971, he gained a seat on the Formula One Constructors' Association and during 1978, he became its president. Previously, the circuit owners controlled the income of the teams and negotiated with each individually; however, Ecclestone persuaded the teams to "hunt as a pack" through FOCA. He offered Formula One to circuit owners as a package, which they could take or leave. In return for the package, almost all that was required was to surrender trackside advertising.

The formation of the Fédération Internationale du Sport Automobile (FISA) during 1979 set off the FISA–FOCA war, during which FISA and its president Jean-Marie Balestre argued repeatedly with FOCA over television revenues and technical regulations. The Guardian said that Ecclestone and Max Mosley "used [FOCA] to wage a guerrilla war with a very long-term aim in view". FOCA threatened to establish a rival series, boycotted a Grand Prix and FISA withdrew its sanction from races. The result was the 1981 Concorde Agreement, which guaranteed technical stability, as teams were to be given reasonable notice of new regulations. Although FISA asserted its right to the TV revenues, it handed the administration of those rights to FOCA.

FISA imposed a ban on ground-effect aerodynamics during . These cars were the most powerful open-wheel circuit racing cars ever.

The development of electronic driver aids began during the 1980s. Lotus began to develop a system of active suspension, which first appeared during 1983 on the Lotus 92. By 1987, this system had been perfected and was driven to victory by Ayrton Senna in the Monaco Grand Prix that year. In the early 1990s, other teams followed suit and semi-automatic gearboxes and traction control were a natural progression. The FIA, due to complaints that technology was determining the outcome of races more than driver skill, banned many such aids for the  season. This resulted in cars that were previously dependent on electronic aids becoming very "twitchy" and difficult to drive. Observers felt the ban on driver aids was in name only, as they "proved difficult to police effectively".

The teams signed a second Concorde Agreement during 1992 and a third in 1997.

On the track, the McLaren and Williams teams dominated the 1980s and 1990s. Brabham were also being competitive during the early part of the 1980s, winning two Drivers' Championships with Nelson Piquet. Powered by Porsche, Honda, and Mercedes-Benz, McLaren won sixteen championships (seven constructors' and nine drivers') in that period, while Williams used engines from Ford, Honda, and Renault to also win sixteen titles (nine constructors' and seven drivers'). Senna died at the 1994 San Marino Grand Prix after crashing into a wall on the exit of the notorious curve Tamburello. The FIA worked to improve the sport's safety standards since that weekend, during which Roland Ratzenberger also died in an accident during Saturday qualifying. No driver died of injuries sustained on the track at the wheel of a Formula One car for 20 years until the 2014 Japanese Grand Prix, where Jules Bianchi collided with a recovery vehicle after aquaplaning off the circuit, dying nine months later from his injuries. Since 1994, three track marshals have died, one at the 2000 Italian Grand Prix, the second at the 2001 Australian Grand Prix and the third at the 2013 Canadian Grand Prix.

This so-called 'narrow track' era resulted in cars with smaller rear tyres, a narrower track overall, and the introduction of grooved tyres to reduce mechanical grip. The objective was to reduce cornering speeds and to produce racing similar to rainy conditions by enforcing a smaller contact patch between tyre and track. This, according to the FIA, was to reduce cornering speeds in the interest of safety.

Results were mixed, as the lack of mechanical grip resulted in the more ingenious designers clawing back the deficit with aerodynamic grip. This resulted in pushing more force onto the tyres through wings and aerodynamic devices, which in turn resulted in less overtaking as these devices tended to make the wake behind the car turbulent or 'dirty'. This prevented other cars from following closely due to their dependence on 'clean' air to make the car stick to the track. The grooved tyres also had the unfortunate side effect of initially being of a harder compound to be able to hold the grooved tread blocks, which resulted in spectacular accidents in times of aerodynamic grip failure, as the harder compound could not grip the track as well.

Due to the technological advances of the 1990s, the cost of competing in Formula One increased dramatically, thus increasing financial burdens. This, combined with the dominance of four teams (largely funded by big car manufacturers such as Mercedes-Benz), caused the poorer independent teams to struggle not only to remain competitive but to stay in business. This effectively forced several teams to withdraw.

Manufacturers' return
 Michael Schumacher and Ferrari won five consecutive Drivers' Championships (2000–2004) and six consecutive Constructors' Championships (1999–2004). Schumacher set many new records, including those for Grand Prix wins (91, since beaten by Lewis Hamilton), wins in a season (thirteen, since beaten by Max Verstappen), and most Drivers' Championships (seven, tied with Lewis Hamilton as of 2021). During 2006, Renault and Alonso won both titles again. Schumacher retired at the end of 2006 after sixteen years in Formula One, but came out of retirement for the 2010 season, racing for the newly formed Mercedes works team, following the rebrand of Brawn GP.

During this period, the championship rules were changed frequently by the FIA with the intention of improving the on-track action and cutting costs. Team orders, legal since the championship started during 1950, were banned during 2002, after several incidents, in which teams openly manipulated race results, generating negative publicity, most famously by Ferrari at the 2002 Austrian Grand Prix. Other changes included the qualifying format, the points scoring system, the technical regulations, and rules specifying how long engines and tyres must last. A "tyre war" between suppliers Michelin and Bridgestone saw lap times fall, although, at the 2005 United States Grand Prix at Indianapolis, seven out of ten teams did not race when their Michelin tyres were deemed unsafe for use, leading to Bridgestone becoming the sole tyre supplier to Formula One for the 2007 season by default. Bridgestone then went on to sign a contract on 20 December 2007 that officially made them the exclusive tyre supplier for the next three seasons.

During 2006, Max Mosley outlined a "green" future for Formula One, in which efficient use of energy would become an important factor.

Starting in 2000, with Ford's purchase of Stewart Grand Prix to form the Jaguar Racing team, new manufacturer-owned teams entered Formula One for the first time since the departure of Alfa Romeo and Renault at the end of 1985. By 2006, the manufacturer teams – Renault, BMW, Toyota, Honda, and Ferrari – dominated the championship, taking five of the first six places in the Constructors' Championship. The sole exception was McLaren, which at the time was part-owned by Mercedes-Benz. Through the Grand Prix Manufacturers Association (GPMA), the manufacturers negotiated a larger share of Formula One's commercial profit and a greater say in the running of the sport.

Manufacturers' decline and return of the privateers
In 2008 and 2009, Honda, BMW, and Toyota all withdrew from Formula One racing within the space of a year, blaming the economic recession. This resulted in the end of manufacturer dominance within the sport. The Honda F1 team went through a management buyout to become Brawn GP with Ross Brawn and Nick Fry running and owning the majority of the organisation. Brawn GP laid off hundreds of employees, but eventually won the year's world championships. BMW F1 was bought out by the original founder of the team, Peter Sauber. The Lotus F1 Team were another, formerly manufacturer-owned team that reverted to "privateer" ownership, together with the buy-out of the Renault team by Genii Capital investors. A link with their previous owners still survived, however, with their car continuing to be powered by a Renault engine until 2014.

McLaren also announced that it was to reacquire the shares in its team from Mercedes-Benz (McLaren's partnership with Mercedes was reported to have started to sour with the McLaren Mercedes SLR road car project and tough F1 championships which included McLaren being found guilty of spying on Ferrari). Hence, during the 2010 season, Mercedes-Benz re-entered the sport as a manufacturer after its purchase of Brawn GP, and split with McLaren after 15 seasons with the team.

During the  season of Formula One, the sport was gripped by the FIA–FOTA dispute. The FIA President Max Mosley proposed numerous cost-cutting measures for the following season, including an optional budget cap for the teams; teams electing to take the budget cap would be granted greater technical freedom, adjustable front and rear wings and an engine not subject to a rev limiter. The Formula One Teams Association (FOTA) believed that allowing some teams to have such technical freedom would have created a 'two-tier' championship, and thus requested urgent talks with the FIA. However, talks broke down and FOTA teams announced, with the exception of Williams and Force India, that 'they had no choice' but to form a breakaway championship series.

On 24 June, an agreement was reached between Formula One's governing body and the teams to prevent a breakaway series. It was agreed teams must cut spending to the level of the early 1990s within two years; exact figures were not specified, and Max Mosley agreed he would not stand for re-election to the FIA presidency in October. Following further disagreements, after Max Mosley suggested he would stand for re-election, FOTA made it clear that breakaway plans were still being pursued. On 8 July, FOTA issued a press release stating they had been informed they were not entered for the 2010 season, and an FIA press release said the FOTA representatives had walked out of the meeting. On 1 August, it was announced FIA and FOTA had signed a new Concorde Agreement, bringing an end to the crisis and securing the sport's future until 2012.

To compensate for the loss of manufacturer teams, four new teams were accepted entry into the 2010 season ahead of a much anticipated 'cost-cap'. Entrants included a reborn Team Lotus – which was led by a Malaysian consortium including Tony Fernandes, the boss of Air Asia; Hispania Racing – the first Spanish Formula One team; as well as Virgin Racing – Richard Branson's entry into the series following a successful partnership with Brawn the year before. They were also joined by the US F1 Team, which planned to run out of the United States as the only non-European-based team in the sport. Financial issues befell the squad before they even made the grid. Despite the entry of these new teams, the proposed cost-cap was repealed and these teams – who did not have the budgets of the midfield and top-order teams – ran around at the back of the field until they inevitably collapsed; HRT in 2012, Caterham (formerly Lotus) in 2014 and Manor (formerly Virgin then Marussia), having survived falling into administration in 2014, went under at the end of 2016.

Hybrid era 
A major rule shake-up in  saw the 2.4-litre naturally-aspirated V8 engines replaced by 1.6-litre turbocharged hybrid power units. This prompted Honda to return to the sport in 2015 as the championship's fourth engine manufacturer. Mercedes emerged as the dominant force after the rule shake-up, with Lewis Hamilton winning the championship closely followed by his main rival and teammate, Nico Rosberg, with the team winning 16 out of the 19 races that season. In , Ferrari was the only challenger to Mercedes, with Vettel taking victory in the three Grands Prix Mercedes did not win.

In the  season, Haas F1 Team joined the grid. The season began in dominant fashion for Nico Rosberg, winning the first 4 Grands Prix. His charge was halted by Max Verstappen, who took his maiden win in Spain in his debut race for Red Bull. After that, the reigning champion Lewis Hamilton decreased the point gap between him and Rosberg to only one point, before taking the championship lead heading into the summer break. Following the break, the 1–2 positioning remained constant until an engine failure for Hamilton in Malaysia left Rosberg in a commanding lead that he would not relinquish in the 5 remaining races. Having won the title by a mere 5 points, Rosberg retired from Formula One at season's end, becoming the first driver since Alain Prost in 1993 to retire after winning the Drivers' Championship.

2017 and 2018 featured a title battle between Mercedes and Ferrari. However, Mercedes continued to experience dominance for the majority of the era, with some even calling the hybrid era the "Mercedes era". The team won 8 consecutive Constructors' Championships from 2014 to 2021 and 7 consecutive Drivers' Championships from 2014 to 2020. The level of dominance was so high that 111 of the 160 races and an average of 78% of the available points from 2014 to 2021 were won by a Mercedes driver, with an average winning margin of 15.5 seconds. Driver Lewis Hamilton won 81 of the races and 6 of the Drivers' Championships that Mercedes won during this 8-year period.

This era has seen an increase in car manufacturer presence in the sport. After Honda's return as an engine manufacturer in 2015, Renault came back as a team in 2016 after buying back the Lotus F1 team. In 2018, Aston Martin and Alfa Romeo became Red Bull and Sauber's title sponsors, respectively. Sauber was rebranded as Alfa Romeo Racing for the 2019 season, while Racing Point part-owner Lawrence Stroll bought a stake in Aston Martin to rebrand the Racing Point team as Aston Martin for 2021. In August 2020, a new Concorde Agreement was signed by all ten F1 teams committing them to the sport until 2025, including a $145M budget cap for car development to support equal competition and sustainable development in the future.

The COVID-19 pandemic forced the sport to adapt to budgetary and logistical limitations. A significant overhaul of the technical regulations intended to be introduced in the 2021 season was pushed back to 2022, with constructors instead using their 2020 chassis for two seasons and a token system limiting which parts could be modified was introduced. The start of the  season was delayed by several months, and both it and  seasons were subject to several postponements, cancellations and rescheduling of races due to the shifting restrictions on international travel. Many races took place behind closed doors and with only essential personnel present to maintain social distancing.

Mercedes dominance began to be challenged by Red Bull in 2021, with the 2021 Drivers' Championship going to Red Bull driver Max Verstappen after a controversial finish at the 2021 Abu Dhabi Grand Prix.

In 2022, a major rule and car design change was announced by the F1 governing body, intended to promote closer racing through the use of ground effects, new aerodynamics, larger wheels with low-profile tires, and redesigned nose and wing regulations. The 2022 Constructors' and Drivers' Championships were won by Red Bull and Verstappen, respectively. This marked the end of a dominant era for Mercedes and Hamilton, with Mercedes finishing 3rd and Hamilton finishing 6th with the first winless season in his career.

Racing and strategy
A Formula One Grand Prix event spans a weekend. It typically begins with two free practice sessions on Friday, and one free practice on Saturday. Additional drivers (commonly known as third drivers) are allowed to run on Fridays, but only two cars may be used per team, requiring a race driver to give up their seat. A qualifying session is held after the last free practice session. This session determines the starting order for the race on Sunday.

Tyre rules
Each driver may use no more than thirteen sets of dry-weather tyres, four sets of intermediate tyres, and three sets of wet-weather tyres during a race weekend.

Qualifying
For much of the sport's history, qualifying sessions differed little from practice sessions; drivers would have one or more sessions in which to set their fastest time, with the grid order determined by each driver's best single lap, with the fastest getting first place on the grid, referred to as pole position. From 1996 to 2002, the format was a one-hour shootout. This approach lasted until the end of 2002 before the rules were changed again because the teams were not running in the early part of the session to take advantage of better track conditions later on.

Grids were generally limited to 26 cars – if the race had more entries, qualification would also decide which drivers would start the race. During the early 1990s, the number of entries was so high that the worst-performing teams had to enter a pre-qualifying session, with the fastest cars allowed through to the main qualifying session. The qualifying format began to change in the early 2000s, with the FIA experimenting with limiting the number of laps, determining the aggregate time over two sessions, and allowing each driver only one qualifying lap.

The current qualifying system was adopted in the 2006 season. Known as "knock-out" qualifying, it is split into three periods, known as Q1, Q2, and Q3. In each period, drivers run qualifying laps to attempt to advance to the next period, with the slowest drivers being "knocked out" of qualification (but not necessarily the race) at the end of the period and their grid positions set within the rearmost five based on their best lap times. Drivers are allowed as many laps as they wish within each period. After each period, all times are reset, and only a driver's fastest lap in that period (barring infractions) counts. Any timed lap started before the end of that period may be completed, and will count toward that driver's placement. The number of cars eliminated in each period is dependent on the total number of cars entered into the championship. Currently, with 20 cars, Q1 runs for 18 minutes, and eliminates the slowest five drivers. During this period, any driver whose best lap takes longer than 107% of the fastest time in Q1 will not be allowed to start the race without permission from the stewards. Otherwise, all drivers proceed to the race albeit in the worst starting positions. This rule does not affect drivers in Q2 or Q3. In Q2, the 15 remaining drivers have 15 minutes to set one of the ten fastest times and proceed to the next period. Finally, Q3 lasts 12 minutes and sees the remaining ten drivers decide the first ten grid positions. At the beginning of the 2016 Formula 1 season, the FIA introduced a new qualifying format, whereby drivers were knocked out every 90 seconds after a certain amount of time had passed in each session. The aim was to mix up grid positions for the race, but due to unpopularity, the FIA reverted to the above qualifying format for the Chinese GP, after running the format for only two races.

Each car is allocated one set of the softest tyres for use in Q3. The cars that qualify for Q3 must return them after Q3; the cars that do not qualify for Q3 can use them during the race. As of 2022, all drivers are given a free choice of tyre to use at the start of the Grand Prix, whereas in previous years only the drivers that did not participate in Q3 had free tyre choice for the start of the race. Any penalties that affect grid position are applied at the end of qualifying. Grid penalties can be applied for driving infractions in the previous or current Grand Prix, or for changing a gearbox or engine component. If a car fails scrutineering, the driver will be excluded from qualifying but will be allowed to start the race from the back of the grid at the race steward's discretion.

2021 has seen the trialling of a 'sprint qualifying' race on the Saturday of three race weekends, with the intention of testing the new approach to qualifying.

Race
The race begins with a warm-up lap, after which the cars assemble on the starting grid in the order they qualified. This lap is often referred to as the formation lap, as the cars lap in formation with no overtaking (although a driver who makes a mistake may regain lost ground). The warm-up lap allows drivers to check the condition of the track and their car, gives the tyres a chance to warm up to increase traction and grip, and also gives the pit crews time to clear themselves and their equipment from the grid for the race start.

Once all the cars have formed on the grid, after the medical car positions itself behind the pack, a light system above the track indicates the start of the race: five red lights are illuminated at intervals of one second; they are all then extinguished simultaneously after an unspecified time (typically less than 3 seconds) to signal the start of the race. The start procedure may be abandoned if a driver stalls on the grid or on the track in an unsafe position, signalled by raising their arm. If this happens, the procedure restarts: a new formation lap begins with the offending car removed from the grid. The race may also be restarted in the event of a serious accident or dangerous conditions, with the original start voided. The race may be started from behind the Safety Car if race control feels a racing start would be excessively dangerous, such as extremely heavy rainfall. As of the  season, there will always be a standing restart. If due to heavy rainfall a start behind the safety car is necessary, then after the track has dried sufficiently, drivers will form up for a standing start. There is no formation lap when races start behind the Safety Car.

Under normal circumstances, the winner of the race is the first driver to cross the finish line having completed a set number of laps. Race officials may end the race early (putting out a red flag) due to unsafe conditions such as extreme rainfall, and it must finish within two hours, although races are only likely to last this long in the case of extreme weather or if the safety car is deployed during the race. When a situation justifies pausing the race without terminating it, the red flag is deployed; since 2005, a ten-minute warning is given before the race is resumed behind the safety car, which leads the field for a lap before it returns to the pit lane (before then the race resumed in race order from the penultimate lap before the red flag was shown).

The race length was standardised to the current  in 1989. However, street races like Monaco have shorter distances, to keep under the two-hour limit.

Drivers may overtake one another for position over the course of the race. If a leader comes across a backmarker (slower car) who has completed fewer laps, the back marker is shown a blue flag telling them that they are obliged to allow the leader to overtake them. The slower car is said to be "lapped" and, once the leader finishes the race, is classified as finishing the race "one lap down". A driver can be lapped numerous times, by any car in front of them. A driver who fails to complete more than 90% of the race distance is shown as "not classified" in the results.

Throughout the race, drivers may make pit stops to change tyres and repair damage (from 1994 to 2009 inclusive, they could also refuel). Different teams and drivers employ different pit stop strategies in order to maximise their car's potential. Three dry tyre compounds, with different durability and adhesion characteristics, are available to drivers. Over the course of a race, drivers must use two of the three available compounds. The different compounds have different levels of performance and choosing when to use which compound is a key tactical decision to make. Different tyres have different colours on their sidewalls; this allows spectators to understand the strategies. Under wet conditions, drivers may switch to one of two specialised wet weather tyres with additional grooves (one "intermediate", for mild wet conditions, such as after recent rain, one "full wet", for racing in or immediately after rain). A driver must make at least one stop to use two tyre compounds; up to three stops are typically made, although further stops may be necessary to fix damage or if weather conditions change. If rain tyres are used, drivers are no longer obliged to use both types of dry tyres.

 Race director
 This role involves generally managing the logistics of each F1 Grand Prix, inspecting cars in parc fermé before a race, enforcing FIA rules, and controlling the lights which start each race. As the head of the race officials, the race director also plays a large role in sorting disputes among teams and drivers. Penalties, such as drive-through penalties (and stop-and-go penalties), demotions on a pre-race start grid, race disqualifications, and fines can all be handed out should parties break regulations. As of 2022, the race directors are Niels Wittich and Eduardo Freitas on an alternating basis, with Herbie Blash as a permanent advisor.

 Safety car
 In the event of an incident that risks the safety of competitors or trackside race marshals, race officials may choose to deploy the safety car. This in effect suspends the race, with drivers following the safety car around the track at its speed in race order, with overtaking not permitted. Cars that have been lapped may, during the safety car period and depending on circumstances permitted by the race director, be allowed to un-lap themselves in order to ensure a smoother restart and to avoid blue flags being immediately thrown upon the resumption of the race with many of the cars in very close proximity to each other. The safety car circulates until the danger is cleared; after it comes in, the race restarts with a "rolling start". Pit stops are permitted under the safety car. Since 2000, the main safety car driver has been German ex-racing driver Bernd Mayländer. On the lap in which the safety car returns to the pits, the leading car takes over the role of the safety car until the timing line. After crossing this line, drivers are allowed to start racing for track position once more. Mercedes-Benz supplies Mercedes-AMG models to Formula One to use as the safety cars. From 2021 onwards, Aston Martin supplies the Vantage to Formula One to use as the safety car, sharing the duty with Mercedes-Benz.

Flags 

Flags specifications and usage are prescribed by Appendix H of the FIA's International Sporting Code.

The format of the race has changed little through Formula One's history. The main changes have revolved around what is allowed at pit stops. In the early days of Grand Prix racing, a driver would be allowed to continue a race in their teammate's car should theirs develop a problem – in the modern era, cars are so carefully fitted to drivers that this has become impossible. In recent years, the emphasis has been on changing refuelling and tyre change regulations. Since the 2010 season, refuelling – which was reintroduced in 1994 – has not been allowed, to encourage less tactical racing following safety concerns. The rule requiring both compounds of tyre to be used during the race was introduced in 2007, again to encourage racing on the track. The safety car is another relatively recent innovation that reduced the need to deploy the red flag, allowing races to be completed on time for a growing international live television audience.

Points system

*A driver must finish within the top ten to receive a point for setting the fastest lap of the race. If the driver who set the fastest lap finishes outside of the top ten, then the point for fastest lap will not be awarded for that race.

Various systems for awarding championship points have been used since 1950. The current system, in place since 2010, awards the top ten cars points in the Drivers' and Constructors' Championships, with the winner receiving 25 points. All points won at each race are added up, and the driver and constructor with the most points at the end of the season are crowned World Champions. Regardless of whether a driver stays with the same team throughout the season, or switches teams, all points earned by them count for the Drivers' Championship.

A driver must be classified in order to receive points, a driver must complete at least 90% of the race distance in order to receive points. Therefore, it is possible for a driver to receive points even if they retired before the end of the race.

From some time between the 1977 and 1980 seasons to the end of the 2021 season if less than 75% of the race laps were completed by the winner, then only half of the points listed in the table were awarded to the drivers and constructors. This has happened on only five occasions in the history of the championship, and it had a notable influence on the final standing of the  season. The last occurrence was at the 2021 Belgian Grand Prix when the race was called off after just three laps behind a safety car due to torrential rain. The half points rule was replaced by a distance-dependent gradual scale system for 2022.

Constructors

A Formula One constructor is the entity credited for designing the chassis and the engine. If both are designed by the same company, that company receives sole credit as the constructor (e.g. Ferrari). If they are designed by different companies, both are credited, and the name of the chassis designer is placed before that of the engine designer (e.g. ). All constructors are scored individually, even if they share either chassis or engine with another constructor (e.g. Williams-Ford, Williams-Honda in ).

Since , Formula One teams have been required to build the chassis in which they compete, and consequently the distinction between the terms "team" and "constructor" became less pronounced, though engines may still be produced by a different entity. This requirement distinguishes the sport from series such as the IndyCar Series which allows teams to purchase chassis, and "spec series" such as Formula 2 which require all cars be kept to an identical specification. It also effectively prohibits privateers, which were common even in Formula One well into the 1970s.

The sport's debut season, saw eighteen teams compete, but due to high costs, many dropped out quickly. In fact, such was the scarcity of competitive cars for much of the first decade of Formula One that Formula Two cars were admitted to fill the grids. Ferrari is the oldest Formula One team, the only still-active team which competed in 1950.

Early manufacturer involvement came in the form of a "factory team" or "works team" (that is, one owned and staffed by a major car company), such as those of Alfa Romeo, Ferrari, or Renault. Ferrari holds the record for having won the most Constructors' Championships (sixteen).

Companies such as Climax, Repco, Cosworth, Hart, Judd and Supertec, which had no direct team affiliation, often sold engines to teams that could not afford to manufacture them. In the early years, independently owned Formula One teams sometimes also built their engines, though this became less common with the increased involvement of major car manufacturers such as BMW, Ferrari, Honda, Mercedes-Benz, Renault, and Toyota, whose large budgets rendered privately built engines less competitive. Cosworth was the last independent engine supplier. It is estimated the major teams spend between €100 and €200 million ($125–$225 million) per year per manufacturer on engines alone.

In the 2007 season, for the first time since the 1981 rule, two teams used chassis built by other teams. Super Aguri started the season using a modified Honda Racing RA106 chassis (used by Honda the previous year), while Scuderia Toro Rosso used the same chassis used by the parent Red Bull Racing team, which was formally designed by a separate subsidiary. The usage of these loopholes was ended for 2010 with the publication of new technical regulations, which require each constructor to own the intellectual property rights to their chassis, The regulations continue to allow a team to subcontract the design and construction of the chassis to a third-party, an option used by the HRT team in 2010 and Haas currently.

Although teams rarely disclose information about their budgets, it is estimated they range from US$66 million to US$400 million each.

Entering a new team in the Formula One World Championship requires a $200 million up-front payment to the FIA, which is then shared equally among the existing teams. As a consequence, constructors desiring to enter Formula One often prefer to buy an existing team: BAR's purchase of Tyrrell and Midland's purchase of Jordan allowed both of these teams to sidestep the large deposit and secure the benefits the team already had, such as TV revenue.

Seven out of the ten teams competing in Formula 1 are based close to London in an area centred around Oxford. Ferrari have both their chassis and engine assembly in Maranello, Italy. The AlphaTauri team are based close to Ferrari in Faenza, whilst the Alfa Romeo team are based near Zurich in Switzerland.

Drivers

Every team in Formula One must run two cars in every session in a Grand Prix weekend, and every team may use up to four drivers in a season. A team may also run two additional drivers in Free Practice sessions, which are often used to test potential new drivers for a career as a Formula One driver or gain experienced drivers to evaluate the car. Most drivers are contracted for at least the duration of a season, with driver changes taking place in-between seasons, in comparison to early years when drivers often competed on an ad hoc basis from race to race. Each competitor must be in the possession of a FIA Super Licence to compete in a Grand Prix, which is issued to drivers who have met the criteria of success in junior motorsport categories and having achieved  of running in a Formula One car. Drivers may also be issued a Super Licence by the World Motor Sport Council if they fail to meet the criteria. Although most drivers earn their seat on ability, commercial considerations also come into play with teams having to satisfy sponsors and financial demands.

Teams also contract test and reserve drivers to stand in for regular drivers when necessary and develop the team's car; although with the reduction on testing the reserve drivers' role mainly takes places on a simulator, such as rFactor Pro, which is used by most of the F1 teams.

Each driver chooses an unassigned number from 2 to 99 (excluding 17 which was retired following the death of Jules Bianchi) upon entering Formula One, and keeps that number during their time in the series. The number one is reserved for the reigning Drivers' Champion, who retains their previous number and may choose to use it instead of the number one. At the onset of the championship, numbers were allocated by race organisers on an ad hoc basis from race to race. The teams would hold those numbers from season to season with the exception of the team with the World Drivers' Champion, which would swap its numbers with the one and two of the previous champion's team. New entrants were allocated spare numbers, with the exception of the number 13 which had been unused since . As teams kept their numbers for long periods of time, car numbers became associated with a team, such as Ferrari's 27 and 28.

, a total of 34 separate drivers have won the World Drivers' Championship, with Michael Schumacher and Lewis Hamilton holding the record for most championships with seven. Lewis Hamilton achieved the most race wins, too, in 2020. Jochen Rindt is the only posthumous World Champion, after his points total was not surpassed despite his fatal accident at the 1970 Italian Grand Prix, with 4 races still remaining in the season. Drivers from the United Kingdom have been the most successful in the sport, with 18 championships among 10 drivers, and  wins.

Feeder series

Most F1 drivers start in kart racing competitions, and then come up through traditional European single-seater series like Formula Ford and Formula Renault to Formula 3, and finally the GP2 Series. GP2 started in 2005, replacing Formula 3000, which itself had replaced Formula Two as the last major stepping-stone into F1. GP2 was rebranded as the FIA Formula 2 Championship in 2017. Most champions from this level graduate into F1, but 2006 GP2 champion Lewis Hamilton became the first F2, F3000 or GP2 champion to win the Formula One drivers' title in 2008. Drivers are not required to have competed at this level before entering Formula One. British F3 has supplied many F1 drivers, with champions, including Nigel Mansell, Ayrton Senna and Mika Häkkinen having moved straight from that series to Formula One, and Max Verstappen made his F1 debut following a single season in European F3. More rarely a driver may be picked from an even lower level, as was the case with 2007 World Champion Kimi Räikkönen, who went straight from Formula Renault to F1.

American open-wheel car racing has also contributed to the Formula One grid. CART champions Mario Andretti and Jacques Villeneuve became F1 World Champions, while Juan Pablo Montoya won seven races in F1. Other CART (also known as ChampCar) champions, like Michael Andretti and Alessandro Zanardi won no races in F1. Other drivers have taken different paths to F1; Damon Hill raced motorbikes, and Michael Schumacher raced in sports cars, albeit after climbing through the junior single-seater ranks. Former F1 driver Paul di Resta raced in DTM until he was signed with Force India in 2011.

Grands Prix

The number of Grands Prix held in a season has varied over the years. The inaugural  world championship season comprised only seven races, while the  season contained 21 races. There were no more than 11 Grands Prix per season during the early decades of the championship, although a large number of non-championship Formula One events also took place. The number of Grands Prix increased to an average of 16 to 17 by the late 1970s, while non-championship events ended in 1983. More Grands Prix began to be held in the 2000s, and recent seasons have seen an average of 19 races.

Six of the original seven races took place in Europe; the only non-European race that counted towards the World Championship in 1950 was the Indianapolis 500, which was held to different regulations and later replaced by the United States Grand Prix. The F1 championship gradually expanded to other non-European countries. The 19 races of the  season were spread over every populated continent except for Africa, with 10 Grands Prix held outside Europe.

Some of the Grands Prix pre-date the formation of the World Championship, such as the French Grand Prix, and were incorporated into the championship as Formula One races in 1950. The British and Italian Grands Prix are the only events to have been held every Formula One season; other long-running races include the Belgian, German, and French Grands Prix. The Monaco Grand Prix was first held in 1929 and has run continuously since 1955 (with the exception of 2020), and is widely considered to be one of the most important and prestigious automobile races in the world.

All Grands Prix have traditionally been run during the day, until the inaugural  hosted the first Formula One night race in 2008, which was followed by the day–night Abu Dhabi Grand Prix in 2009 and the Bahrain Grand Prix which converted to a night race in 2014. Other Grands Prix in Asia have had their start times adjusted to benefit the European television audience.

Returning additions (2008–present)
Bold denotes the Grands Prix scheduled as part of the  season.
 European Grand Prix at Valencia Street Circuit (2008–2012)
 United States Grand Prix at Circuit of the Americas (2012–2019, 2021–present)
 Austrian Grand Prix at Red Bull Ring (2014–present)
 Mexican Grand Prix at Autódromo Hermanos Rodríguez (2015–2019); renamed Mexico City Grand Prix (2021–present)
 European Grand Prix at Baku City Circuit (2016; renamed the Azerbaijan Grand Prix for 2017–2019, 2021–present)
 French Grand Prix at Circuit Paul Ricard (2018–2019, 2021–2022)
 Portuguese Grand Prix at Algarve International Circuit (2020–2021)
 Imola Circuit with the Emilia Romagna Grand Prix (2020–present; previously hosted the Italian Grand Prix and the San Marino Grand Prix)
 Dutch Grand Prix at Circuit Zandvoort (2021–present)

New Locations Initiative (2008–present)
Bold denotes the Grands Prix scheduled as part of the  season.

Since 2008, the Formula One Group has been targeting new "destination cities" to expand its global reach, with the aim to produce races from countries that have not previously been involved in the sport. This initiative started with the 2008 Singapore Grand Prix.

Future Grands Prix
Below is a list for Grands Prix contracted to join or return to the calendar in upcoming seasons.

Circuits

A typical circuit features a stretch of straight road on which the starting grid is situated. The pit lane, where the drivers stop for tyres, aerodynamic adjustments and minor repairs (such as changing the car's nose due to front wing damage) during the race, retirements from the race, and where the teams work on the cars before the race, is normally located next to the starting grid. The layout of the rest of the circuit varies widely, although in most cases the circuit runs in a clockwise direction. Those few circuits that run anticlockwise (and therefore have predominantly left-handed corners) can cause drivers neck problems due to the enormous lateral forces generated by F1 cars pulling their heads in the opposite direction to normal. A single race requires hotel rooms to accommodate at least 5,000 visitors.

Most of the circuits currently in use are specially constructed for competition. The current street circuits are Monaco, Melbourne, Singapore, Baku, Miami and Jeddah although races in other urban locations come and go (Las Vegas and Detroit, for example) and proposals for such races are often discussed – most recently Las Vegas. The glamour and history of the Monaco race are the primary reasons why the circuit is still in use, even though it does not meet the strict safety requirements imposed on other tracks. Three-time World champion Nelson Piquet famously described racing in Monaco as "like riding a bicycle around your living room".

Several of the new circuits in F1, especially those designed by Tilke, have been criticised as lacking the "flow" of such classics as Spa-Francorchamps and Imola. His redesign of the Hockenheim circuit in Germany for example, while providing more capacity for grandstands and eliminating extremely long and dangerous straights, has been frowned upon by many who argue that part of the character of the Hockenheim circuits was the long and blinding straights into dark forest sections. These newer circuits, however, are generally agreed to meet the safety standards of modern Formula One better than the older ones.

The Circuit of the Americas in Austin, the Sochi Autodrom in Sochi and the Baku City Circuit in Azerbaijan have all been introduced as brand new tracks since 2012. In 2020, Algarve International Circuit debuted on the F1 calendar as the venue of the Portuguese Grand Prix, with the country having last hosted a race in 1996. In 2021, Circuit Zandvoort returned to the F1 calendar as the Dutch Grand Prix, having last hosted a race in 1985.

Cars and technology

Modern Formula One cars are mid-engined, hybrid, semi-open cockpit, open-wheel single-seaters. The chassis is made largely of carbon-fibre composites, rendering it light but extremely stiff and strong. The whole car, including the driver but not fuel, weighs only  – the minimum weight set by the regulations. If the construction of the car is lighter than the minimum, it can be ballasted up to add the necessary weight. The race teams take advantage of this by placing this ballast at the extreme bottom of the chassis, thereby locating the centre of gravity as low as possible in order to improve handling and weight transfer.

The cornering speed of Formula One cars is largely determined by the aerodynamic downforce that they generate, which pushes the car down onto the track. This is provided by "wings" mounted at the front and rear of the vehicle, and by ground effect created by low air pressure under the flat bottom of the car. The aerodynamic design of the cars is very heavily constrained to limit performance. The previous generation of cars sported a large number of small winglets, "barge boards", and turning vanes designed to closely control the flow of the air over, under, and around the car.

The other major factor controlling the cornering speed of the cars is the design of the tyres. Instead, each tyre had four large circumferential grooves on its surface designed to limit the cornering speed of the cars. Slick tyres returned to Formula One in the  season. Suspension is double wishbone or multilink front and rear, with pushrod operated springs and dampers on the chassis – one exception being that of the 2009 specification Red Bull Racing car (RB5) which used pullrod suspension at the rear, the first car to do so since the Minardi PS01 in 2001. Ferrari used a pullrod suspension at both the front and rear in their  car. Both Ferrari (F138) and McLaren (MP4-28) of the 2013 season used a pullrod suspension at both the front and the rear. In , McLaren (MCL36) and Red Bull Racing (RB18) switched to a pullrod front suspension and push rod rear suspension.

Carbon-carbon disc brakes are used for reduced weight and increased frictional performance. These provide a very high level of braking performance and are usually the element that provokes the greatest reaction from drivers new to the formula.

In , the technical regulations changed considerably in order to reduce the turbulence (commonly referred to as "dirty air") produced by the aerodynamics of the car. This includes a redesigned front and rear wing, larger wheels with a lower tyre profile, wheel covers, small winglets, the banning of barge boards, and the reintroduction of Ground effect downforce production. These have been changed to promote racing, meaning cars lose less downforce when following another car. It allows cars to follow another at a much closer distance, without extending the gap due to the turbulent air. (See 2022 Formula One World Championship Technical regulations)

Formula One cars must have four wheels made of the same metallic material, which must be one of two magnesium alloys specified by the FIA. Magnesium alloy wheels made by forging are used to achieve maximum unsprung rotating weight reduction. As of 2022, the wheels are covered with "spec" (Standardised) Wheel Covers, the wheel diametre has increased from 13 inches to 18 inches (reducing the "tyre profile"), and small winglets have been placed over the front tyres.

Starting with the 2014 Formula 1 season, the engines have changed from a 2.4-litre naturally aspirated V8 to turbocharged 1.6-litre V6 "power-units". These get a significant amount of their power from electric motors. In addition they include a lot of energy recovery technology. Engines run on unleaded fuel closely resembling publicly available petrol. The oil which lubricates and protects the engine from overheating is very similar in viscosity to water. For the 2009 Formula One season the engines were further restricted to 18,000 rpm.

A wide variety of technologies – including active suspension are banned under the current regulations. According to Honda, the car fully met the FIA Formula One regulations. Even with the limitations on aerodynamics, at  aerodynamically generated downforce is equal to the weight of the car, and the oft-repeated claim that Formula One cars create enough downforce to "drive on the ceiling", while possible in principle, has never been put to the test. Downforce of 2.5 times the car's weight can be achieved at full speed. The downforce means that the cars can achieve a lateral force with a magnitude of up to 3.5 times that of the force of gravity (3.5g) in cornering. Consequently, the driver's head is pulled sideways with a force equivalent to the weight of 20 kg in corners. Such high lateral forces are enough to make breathing difficult and the drivers need supreme concentration and fitness to maintain their focus for the one to two hours that it takes to complete the race. A high-performance road car like the Enzo Ferrari only achieves around 1g.

, each team may have no more than two cars available for use at any time. Each driver may use no more than four engines during a championship season unless they drive for more than one team. If more engines are used, they drop ten places on the starting grid of the event at which an additional engine is used. The only exception is where the engine is provided by a manufacturer or supplier taking part in its first championship season, in which case up to five may be used by a driver. Each driver may use no more than one gearbox for six consecutive events; every unscheduled gearbox change requires the driver to drop five places on the grid unless they failed to finish the previous race due to reasons beyond the team's control.

, each driver is limited to three power units per season, before incurring grid penalties.

Revenue and profits

In March 2007, F1 Racing published its annual estimates of spending by Formula One teams. The total spending of all eleven teams in 2006 was estimated at $2.9 billion US. This was broken down as follows: Toyota $418.5 million, Ferrari $406.5 m, McLaren $402 m, Honda $380.5 m, BMW Sauber $355 m, Renault $324 m, Red Bull $252 m, Williams $195.5 m, Midland F1/Spyker-MF1 $120 m, Toro Rosso $75 m, and Super Aguri $57 million.

Costs vary greatly from team to team. Honda, Toyota, McLaren-Mercedes, and Ferrari were estimated to have spent approximately $200 million on engines in 2006, Renault spent approximately $125 million and Cosworth's 2006 V8 was developed for $15 million. In contrast to the 2006 season on which these figures are based, the 2007 sporting regulations banned all performance-related engine development.

Formula One teams pay entry fees of $500,000, plus $5,000 per point scored the previous year or $6,000 per point for the winner of the Constructors' Championship. Formula One drivers pay a FIA Super Licence fee, which in 2013 was €10,000 plus €1,000 per point.

There have been controversies with the way profits are shared among the teams. The smaller teams have complained that the profits are unevenly shared, favouring established top teams. In September 2015, Force India and Sauber officially lodged a complaint with the European Union against Formula One questioning the governance and stating that the system of dividing revenues and determining the rules is unfair and unlawful.

The cost of building a brand new permanent circuit can be up to hundreds of millions of dollars, while the cost of converting a public road, such as Albert Park, into a temporary circuit is much less. Permanent circuits, however, can generate revenue all year round from leasing the track for private races and other races, such as MotoGP. The Shanghai International Circuit cost over $300 million and the Istanbul Park circuit cost $150 million to build.

A number of Formula One drivers earn the highest salary of any drivers in auto racing. The highest-paid driver in 2021 is Lewis Hamilton, who received $55 million in salary from Mercedes AMG Petronas F1 – a record for any driver. The very top Formula One drivers get paid more than IndyCar or NASCAR drivers; however, the earnings immediately fall off after the top three F1 drivers, and the majority of NASCAR racers will make more money than their F1 counterparts. Most top IndyCar drivers are paid around a tenth of their Formula One counterparts.

In the second quarter of 2020, Formula One reported a loss revenue of $122 million and an income of $24 million. This was a result of the delay of the racing championship start as a result of the COVID-19 pandemic. The company grossed revenues of $620 million for the same quarter the previous year.

Future

The expense of Formula One has seen the FIA and the Formula One Commission attempt to create new regulations to lower the costs for a team to compete in the sport.

Following their purchase of the commercial rights to the sport in 2017, Liberty Media announced their vision for the future of Formula One at the 2018 Bahrain Grand Prix. The proposal identified five key areas, including streamlining the governance of the sport, emphasising cost-effectiveness, maintaining the sport's relevance to road cars and encouraging new manufacturers to enter the championship whilst enabling them to be competitive.

On 19 August 2020, it was announced that all 10 teams had signed the new Concorde Agreement. This came into effect at the start of the 2021 season and changed how prize money and TV revenue is distributed.

Responsibility towards the environment

Formula One has launched a plan to become carbon neutral by 2030. By 2025, all events should become "sustainable", including eliminating single-use plastics and ensuring all waste is reused, recycled or composted.

In January 2020, FIA and Formula One signed the United Nations "Sports for Climate Action" framework. After the signing was announced, FIA President Jean Todt said: "As an international Federation comprising 244 members in 140 countries and the leader in motor sport and mobility development, we are fully committed to global environmental protection. The signing of this UN Sports for Climate Action Framework reinforces the momentum that has been growing in our Federation for many years. Since the introduction of the hybrid power unit in F1 to the creation of the Environment and Sustainability Commission, the entire FIA community has been investing time, energy and financial resources to the benefit of environmental innovations. We aim to inspire greater awareness and best practice in sustainability motor sport standards."

From the 2021–22 season, all cars will increase the bio-component of their fuel, using E10 fuel, rather than the 5.75% of ethanol currently used. This percentage is expected to grow again in the future. In December 2020, the FIA claimed that it had developed a fuel with 100% sustainability, to be used in Formula One from either 2025 or 2026, when new engine regulations come into force.

Responsibility towards social inequities in the sport 
Prior to the beginning of the 2020 Formula One World Championship, F1 announced and launched the #WeRaceAsOne initiative. The initiative primarily focuses on visible displays of solidarity in the fight against racism on Grand Prix Weekends, as well as the creation of a Formula 1 Task Force that will "listen to people from across the paddock [...] and make conclusions on the actions required to improve the diversity and opportunity in Formula 1 at all levels". The move spurs from the growing questions about racism and global inequalities perpetuated by the sport. The 70-year history of the World Championship has been dominated by European and white drivers, with the first (and only) black driver winning the world championship in 2008.

In addition to organization-wide measures, individual teams have also acknowledged deficiencies in the sport's cultural and political activism. During the 2020 season, the Mercedes-AMG Petronas F1 Team conducted a study of its racial composition and found that approximately 95% of its workforce was white. Due to the results of the study, the team changed the car's livery to promote anti-racism messages and also launched the Accelerate 25 programme. The program vows that approximately 25% of all new hires to the team will come from underrepresented minorities in the sport until 2025.

The 20 drivers on the grid have also stood in solidarity on multiple occasions in the fight against racism both on and off the track. Following the murder of George Floyd in the summer of 2020, all twenty drivers wore "End Racism" shirts and took part in an organised anti-racism protest during the pre-race formalities. In the year since, Lewis Hamilton has remained vocal in his pre-race attire, with other drivers occasionally wearing change-demanding clothing. Specifically, Sebastian Vettel sported a rainbow-colored shirt with the words "Same Love" ahead of the 2021 Hungarian Grand Prix in an effort to bring awareness to Hungary's anti-LGBT law.

Media coverage

Formula One can be seen live or tape delayed in almost every country and territory and attracts one of the largest global television audiences. The 2008 season attracted a global audience of 600 million people per race. The cumulative television audience was calculated to be 54 billion for the 2001 season, broadcast to 200 territories.

During the early 1990s, Formula One Group created a number of trademarks, an official logo, an official TV graphics package and in 2003, an official website for the sport in an attempt to give it a corporate identity.

TV stations all take what is known as the "World Feed", either produced historically by the "host broadcaster" or by Formula One Management (FOM). The host broadcaster either had one feed for all, or two separate feeds – a feed for local viewers and a feed for international viewers. The one size fits all approach meant that there was bias to a certain team or driver during the event, which led to viewers missing out on more important action and incidents, while the two feed approach meant that replays (for when returning from an ad break) and local bias action could be overlaid on the local feed while the international feed was left unaffected.

The only station that differed from this set up was "DF1" (re-branded to "Premiere" then to "Sky Deutschland") – a German channel which offers all sessions live and interactive, with features such as the onboard and pit-lane channels. This service was purchased by Bernie Ecclestone at the end of 1996 and became F1 Digital Plus, which was made more widely available around Europe until the end of 2002, when the cost of the digital interactive service was thought too much.

On 12 January 2011, F1 announced that it would adopt the HD format for the 2011 season.

It was announced on 29 July 2011, that Sky Sports and the BBC would team up to show the races in F1 from 2012 to 2018. Sky launched a dedicated channel, Sky Sports F1 which covered all races live without commercial interruption as well as live practice and qualifying sessions, along with F1 programming, including interviews, archive action and magazine shows. In 2012 the BBC broadcast live coverage of half of the races in the season. The BBC ended its television contract after the 2015 season, three years earlier than planned. The free-to-air TV rights were picked up by Channel 4 until the end of the 2018 season. Sky Sports F1 coverage remained unaffected and BBC Radio 5 Live and 5 Live Sports Extra coverage was extended until 2021. As of 2022, BBC Radio 5 and 5 Live has rights to such coverage until 2024.

While Sky Sports and Channel 4 are the two major broadcasters of Formula 1, other countries show Formula One races. Many use commentary from either Sky Sports or Channel 4. In most of Asia (excluding China), the two main broadcasters of Formula one include the Fox network and Star Sports (in India). In the United States, ESPN holds the official rights to broadcast the sport while ABC also holds free-to-air rights for some races under the ESPN on ABC banner. In Germany, Austria and Switzerland, the two main broadcasters are RTL Germany and n-TV. In China, there are multiple channels that broadcast Formula One which include CCTV, Tencent, Guangdong TV and Shanghai TV. Currently in France, the only channel that broadcasts Formula one is the pay TV channel Canal+, having renewed its broadcasting rights until 2024.

The official Formula One website has live timing charts that can be used during the race to follow the leaderboard in real time. An official application has been available for the Apple App Store since 2009, and on Google Play since 2011, that shows users a real-time feed of driver positions, timing and commentary. On 26 November 2017 Formula One unveiled a new logo, which replaced the previous "flying one" in use since 1993.

In March 2018, FOM announced the launch of F1 TV, an over-the-top (OTT) streaming platform that lets viewers watch multiple simultaneous video feeds and timing screens in addition to traditional directed race footage and commentary.

Distinction between Formula One and World Championship races

Currently, the terms "Formula One race" and "World Championship race" are effectively synonymous. Since 1984, every Formula One race has counted towards the World Championship, and every World Championship race has been run to Formula One regulations. However, the two terms are not interchangeable.
 The first Formula One race was held in 1946, whereas the World Championship did not start until 1950.
 In the 1950s and 1960s, there were many Formula One races that did not count for the World Championship (e.g., in 1950, a total of twenty-two Formula One races were held, of which only six counted towards the World Championship). The number of non-championship Formula One events decreased throughout the 1970s and 1980s, to the point where the last non-championship Formula One race was the 1983 Race of Champions.
 The World Championship was not always exclusively composed of Formula One events:
 The World Championship was originally established as the "World Championship for Drivers", i.e., without the term "Formula One" in the title. It only officially became the FIA Formula One World Championship in 1981.
 From 1950 to 1960, the Indianapolis 500 race counted towards the World Championship. This race was run to American Automobile Association, and later United States Automobile Club, Championship Car regulations, rather than to Formula One regulations. Only one of the World Championship regulars, Alberto Ascari in 1952, started at Indianapolis during this period.
 From 1952 to 1953, all races counting towards the World Championship (except the Indianapolis 500) were run to Formula Two regulations. Formula One was not changed to Formula Two during this period; the Formula One regulations remained the same, and numerous non-championship Formula One races were staged during this time.

The distinction is most relevant when considering career summaries and all-time lists. For example, in the List of Formula One drivers, Clemente Biondetti is shown with a single race against his name. Biondetti actually competed in four Formula One races in 1950, but only one of these counted for the World Championship. Similarly, several Indianapolis 500 winners technically won their first World Championship race, though most record books ignore this and instead only record regular World Championship participants.

In the earlier history of Formula One, many races took place outside the World Championship, and local championships run to Formula One regulations also occurred. These events often took place on circuits that were not always suitable for the World Championship, and featured local cars and drivers as well as those competing in the championship.

European non-championship racing
In the early years of Formula One, before the world championship was established, there were around twenty races held from late Spring to early Autumn in Europe, although not all of these were considered significant. Most competitive cars came from Italy, particularly Alfa Romeo. After the start of the world championship, these non-championship races continued. In the 1950s and 1960s, there were many Formula One races which did not count for the World Championship; in  a total of twenty-two Formula One races were held, of which only six counted towards the World Championship. In 1952 and 1953, when the world championship was run to Formula Two regulations, non-championship events were the only Formula One races that took place.

Some races, particularly in the UK, including the Race of Champions, Oulton Park International Gold Cup and the International Trophy, were attended by the majority of the world championship contenders. Other smaller events were regularly held in locations not part of the championship, such as the Syracuse and Danish Grands Prix, although these only attracted a small amount of the championship teams and relied on private entries and lower Formula cars to make up the grid. These became less common through the 1970s and 1983 saw the last non-championship Formula One race; the 1983 Race of Champions at Brands Hatch, won by reigning World Champion Keke Rosberg in a Williams-Cosworth in a close fight with American Danny Sullivan.

South African Formula One championship

South Africa's flourishing domestic Formula One championship ran from 1960 through to 1975. The frontrunning cars in the series were recently retired from the world championship although there was also a healthy selection of locally built or modified machines. Frontrunning drivers from the series usually contested their local World Championship Grand Prix, as well as occasional European events, although they had little success at that level.

British Formula One Championship

The DFV helped make the UK domestic Formula One championship possible between 1978 and 1980. As in South Africa a decade before, second hand cars from manufacturers like Lotus and Fittipaldi Automotive were the order of the day, although some, such as the March 781, were built specifically for the series. In 1980, the series saw South African Desiré Wilson become the only woman to win a Formula One race when she triumphed at Brands Hatch in a Wolf WR3.

See also 

 Formula One video games

Notes

References

Further reading 

 Arron, Simon & Hughes, Mark (2003). The Complete Book of Formula One. Motorbooks International. .
 Gross, Nigel et al. (1999). "Grand Prix Motor Racing". In, 100 Years of Change: Speed and Power (pp. 55–84). Parragon.
 Hayhoe, David & Holland, David (2006). Grand Prix Data Book (4th edition). Haynes, Sparkford, UK. .
 Higham, Peter (2003). The international motor racing guide. David Bull, Phoenix, AZ, USA. .
 
 Jones, Bruce (1997). The Ultimate Encyclopedia of Formula One. Hodder & Stoughton.
 Jones, Bruce (1998). Formula One: The Complete Stats and Records of Grand Prix Racing. Parragon.
 Jones, Bruce (2003). The Official ITV Sport Guide: Formula One Grand Prix 2003. Carlton. Includes foreword by Martin Brundle. .
 Jones, Bruce (2005). The Guide to 2005 FIA Formula One World Championship: The World's Bestselling Grand Prix Guide. Carlton. .
 Lang, Mike (1981–1992). Grand Prix! volumes 1–4. Haynes, Sparkford, UK.
 Menard, Pierre (2006). The Great Encyclopedia of Formula 1, 5th edition. Chronosport, Switzerland. 
 Miltner, Harry (2007). Race Travel Guide 2007. egoth: Vienna, Austria. 
 Small, Steve (2000). Grand Prix Who's Who (3rd edition). Travel Publishing, UK. .
 Tremayne, David & Hughes, Mark (1999). The Concise Encyclopedia of Formula One. Parragon
 Twite, Mike. "Formula Regulations: Categories for International Racing" in Northey, Tom, ed. The World Of Automobiles, Volume 6, pp. 701–3. London: Phoebus, 1978.

External links 
 
 

 
1950 establishments in Europe
1
1
Games and sports introduced in 1947
Open wheel racing